The Portway park and ride site is on the A4 Portway at Shirehampton, to the north-west of Bristol, England, close to junction 18 of the M5 motorway.

History
The site opened in April 2002 with 300 car parking spaces as part of the Bristol park & ride network. There had been considerable opposition from local residents. The site was expanded in 2008 to provide 830 car parking spaces to coincide with the opening of the Cabot Circus shopping mall in Broadmead. Services were operated by First West of England until CT Plus took over in April 2012. First West of England resumed operating the services in September 2016.

Service
One regular service operates from the site, using buses with green livery. The site opens at 6:00am with the first bus leaving at 6:15am Monday to Saturday. On Sunday, the site opens at 9:00am with the first bus leaving at 9:30am. The last bus leaves Bristol city centre at 8:30pm Monday to Saturday and 6:00pm on Sunday. The site closes at 9:30pm.

The site also serves Ashton Gate Stadium during Bristol Rugby and Bristol City home fixtures. The AG1 services operates for both 3:00pm and 7:45pm fixtures of both clubs.

Railway

The Severn Beach railway line runs adjacent to the site. It is planned that a new station, be built to serve the site. The station was allocated £2.2million in June 2017 from the Local Growth Fund, via the West of England local enterprise partnership, and at that time completion was expected in 2019. Spending of £1.5million was later moved to the 2021–22 year. The station is expected to open in summer 2022.

See also
Bus services in Bristol

References

External links

Bus transport in Bristol
Park and ride schemes in the United Kingdom
Transport infrastructure completed in 2002
2002 establishments in England